Sanyasi is a 1975 Hindi film directed by Sohanlal Kanwar, starring Manoj Kumar and Hema Malini as leads. The film is noted for its music by Shankar Jaikishan. The film was the third highest grossing film of the year.

Plot
Renukadevi (Sulochana) is widowed and the mother of a son named Ram (Manoj Kumar). Her husband had indulged in all possible vices, and died. Her father-in-law, Rai (Brahma Bharadwaj), does not want Ram to repeat his father's mistakes, and teaches him all the positive values of the Hindu religion, in particular the contents of the Bhagavad Gita. As a result, Ram refrains from all known vices, is an expert in yogic exercises, decides to live the life of a celibate, and refuses to marry anyone. When Rai dies, Renuka asks Ram to fulfill his grandfather's last wishes, one of which was to get married. She even arranges his introduction to Aarti (Hema Malini), an attractive young woman. But Ram is convinced that marriage is not for him. Renuka is overjoyed when her estranged brother, Gopinath, (Raj Mehra) and his son, Rakesh, (Prem Chopra) return from abroad. With their help she hopes to get Ram married with Aarti. Then things get complicated when Rakesh falls in love with Aarti. Ram leaves town to attend to business, and circumstances propel Renuka to will her entire estate to Rakesh and change his name to Bharat, with the blessings of a renowned saint named Ishwar Baba. (Premnath). After this ceremony, the people around Renuka start showing their true colors, and after an open-palmed stinging slap from Aarti, Renuka realizes that her place in this house is now worse than that of a lowly servant. Renuka now finds out that Aarti, Gopinath, and Rakesh are not who they claim to be, but will this realization be enough to reverse the order of events, or does fate have something even worse in store for Renuka?

Synopsis 
Ram (Manoj Kumar): In a gorgeous place stays a sanyasi – a religious minded young man who runs away from the wedding nuptials.

Aarti (Hema Malini): Today's Menaka. Yesterday's Menaka tried to disturb Vishwamitra's communion with god and today's Menaka Aarti tries to distract Ram's mind away from his religious thoughts. She adopts many disguises and agrees to do what one least expects a noble, attractive, and good girl like her to attempt.

Renuka Devi (Sulochana): Ram's mother. Her husband ruined his life while he was still young, because of drinking and womanising. Not wanting her son to be like his father, she has kept Ram surrounded by a religious atmosphere since his childhood. The result is that Ram grows up to be different from all other young men – a true sanyasi.

Girdhari and Banwari: The robbers. They have entered Ram's house in disguise as his uncle and cousin, posing as father and son. They have taken the place of Renuka Devi's brother and his son who died in a train accident. Ram's mother embraces them as her long separated brother and nephew, but does not know that these two devils are here to swindle her belongings and happiness.

Shanti Baba: A true sanyasi. Who can kill the soul that lives only to bring happiness to others? The most unforgettable screen character you will ever come across, the true sanyasi who lays down his life in order to rescue a helpless woman from the clutches of Mangal Singh.

Ishwar Baba: A fraud, a blot on the very noble tribe of a saffron-clad sanyasi. He is, in fact, evil dacoit Mangal Singh, a murderer, rapist and drunkard. But in daytime he poses as a recluse and pretends to perform miracles to impress the unsuspecting devotees.

Cast
 Manoj Kumar ... Ram Rai
 Hema Malini ... Aarti/Champa
 Prem Nath ... Mangal Singh (as Premnath)
 Prem Chopra ... Banwari
 Aruna Irani ... Radhika
 Pran 	... Shanti Baba 'Guruji'
 Indrani Mukherjee ... Devotee
 Kamini Kaushal ... Champa's Mother
 Sulochana ... Renuka Devi 
 Chandra Shekhar ... Police Inspector Shekhar 
 Sailesh Kumar ... Ranjeet (as Shailesh Kumar)
 Raj Mehra ... Girdhari
 Hari Shivdasani ... Family Advocate
 Murad ... Seth Hiralal
 Brahm Bhardwaj ... Rai (as Bram Bhradwaj)
 V. Gopal ... Mangal Mistry's Man
 C.S. Dubey ... Munimji
 Rajpal 		
 Yunus Parvez ... Hakim Rahim Khan (as Yunus Parveez)
 Keshav Rana ... Mangal Mistry's Man
 Dhumal ... Dinu - House Servant
 Kuljeet 	 		
 Kamaldeep ... Mangal Mistry's Man (as Kamal Deep)
 Narbada Shankar 			
 Tiger sonnaiii 	
 Shera 	
 Romeo 	
 G.A. Sheikh 	 		
 Dinesh Hingoo ... Roop Chand
 Bihari 	 		
 Harbans Darshan M. Arora ... Man who received donations (as Darshan Arora)
 Sabina	
 Sheela ... (as Sheila)
 Madhup Sharma 	 		
 Krishna Kumar 		
 Kumari Naaz ... Savitri (uncredited)
 Nazima ... Aarti (uncredited)
 Helen ... 1st Dancer (song "Tu Mera Din Hai")
 Jayshree T. ... 3rd Dancer (song "Tu Mera Din Hai")
 Arpana Choudhary ... 2nd Dancer (song "Tu Mera Din Hai") (as Aparna Chowdhary)

Awards 

 23rd Filmfare Awards:

Nominated

 Best Film – Sohanlal Kanwar
 Best Director – Sohanlal Kanwar
 Best Actor – Manoj Kumar
 Best Actress – Hema Malini
 Best Music Director – Shankar–Jaikishan
 Best Lyricist – Visveshwara Sharma for "Chal Sanyasi"
 Best Male Playback Singer – Manna Dey for "Kya Maar Sakegi"

Soundtrack 
Music Director for all songs: Shankar-Jaikishan

References

External links 
 

1975 films
1970s Hindi-language films
Films scored by Shankar–Jaikishan